Santa Eufemia may refer to:

Santa Eufemia, Spain
Santa Eufemia del Barco, Spain
Santa Eufemia del Arroyo, Spain
Sant'Eufemia a Maiella, Italy
Santa Eufemia, Argentina, in Juárez Celman Department
Gulf of Saint Euphemia, Italy

See also
 Euphemia, the Christian saint after whom all of the above were named
 Eufemia (disambiguation) 
 Sant'Eufemia (disambiguation)